The 1870 Oregon gubernatorial election took place on June 6, 1870 to elect the governor of the U.S. state of Oregon. The election matched Republican Joel Palmer against Democrat La Fayette Grover.

Results

References

Gubernatorial
1870
Oregon
June 1870 events